Folías is the debut studio album by Spanish musician el Guincho. It was released in 2007 by Discos Compulsivos.

Track listing 

Cumpleaños En Los Lagare - 2:06
Color de Galleta - 2:14
Jugadores De Juegos - 2:30
Es Mejor Ser Un Kart - 1:58
Ven A Mi Fiesta - 2:04
El Tiburon - 1:26
Galapagos - 3:08
100 veces fuego - 2:02
Abejitas - 2:18
Te Lo Digo En Chino - 1:30
Contabas Indios En La Piscina - 2:04
Cerrando Por Tajaraste - 3:06
Gran Canaria - 2:16

2007 debut albums
El Guincho albums